"Paris, Capital of the 19th Century" (1938) is one of a diptych of completed essays that was composed during the preparatory outlining and drafting phase of Walter Benjamin's uncompleted composition of the Arcades Project. The Paris of the Second Empire in Baudelaire is its sister essay. The major themes of The Arcades Project—the construction of the Parisian arcades in the early 19th century, their blossoming as a habitat for the flâneur, their demolition during Haussmannization—appear as leitmotifs in both essays.

 Paris, Capital of the 19th Century is a sketch or outline of the Arcades Project much in the same manner that Grundrisse was Karl Marx's outline for his intended eight volume masterwork Das Kapital of which he was only able to complete one volume. Whereas its sibling essay focuses on the poetry of Baudelaire as a microcosm for the full scope of ideas that Benjamin intended to address in the Arcades Project, the essays of Paris, Capital of the 19th Century attempt to cover the full spectrum of themes whose development was ultimately intended.

History 
In the late twenties, Walter Benjamin began to collect material and ideas for a history of the emergence of urban commodity capitalism in Paris around 1850 (this study eventually evolved into The Arcades Project). In 1935, while Benjamin was living in exile in France, Fritz Pollock (co-director "of the Frankfurt School) suggested that Benjamin produce an exposé of the project, which came out in the form of the essay "Paris, Capital of the 19th Century."

Summary 
"Paris, Capital of the 19th Century" is organized into six sections: (1) Fourier, or the Arcades; (2) Daguerre, or the Panoramas; (3) Grandville, or the World Exhibitions; (4) Louis-Philippe, or the Interior; (5) Baudelaire, or the Streets of Paris; (6) Hausmann, or the Barricades. Each section-title pairs an important figure from the city's history with a contemporary innovation in architecture local to Paris.

Fourier, or the Arcades 

The construction of the Arcades in the earlier half of the 19th century is described as well as attendant innovations (eg. "The arcades are the scene of the first gas lighting." The construction of the arcades is coextensive with "the advent of building in iron.").  The new methods requisite for the construction of the arcades grow out of the innovation of pre-fabricated iron-rails for the new rail transportation system which is beginning to be built around the world at this time. 

Benjamin observes that antique design concepts mingle with futuristic design concepts in the layout and decoration of the arcades, and he compares the project of the Arcades as a market-driven incarnation of Fourier's phalanstery, a type of building designed for a self-contained utopian community that was "supposed to lead men back to the condition in which virtue is superfluous."

Daguerre, or the Panoramas 

Benjamin builds an analogy between the Fourier's innovations and Louis Daguerre's. "As architecture begins to outgrow art in the use of iron construction, so does painting in the panoramas." Daguerre begins as a panorama painter, a genre of painting whose climax coincides with the appearance of the arcades (which would often be decorated with panoramic paintings). "There were tireless exertions of technical skill to make the panoramas the scenes of a perfect imitation of nature, reproducing the changing time of day, the rising of the moon, the rushing of the waterfall." Mid-career Daguerre invents an early model of the camera. 

As Benjamin observes, "Photography leads to the annihilation of the portrait minitiaturist," and changes the discipline of painting significantly. "[Photography's] importance becomes greater the more questionable, in face of the new technical and social reality, the subjective element in painting and graphic information is felt to be... Photography for its part has...enormously expanded the scope of the commodity trade by putting on the market in unlimited quantities figures, landscapes, events that have either not been salable at all or have been available only as pictures for single customers."

Grandville, or the World Exhibitions 

Here Benjamin examines the way in which the World Exhibitions (preceded by National Industrial Exhibitions) give birth to the entertainment industry and for the first time begin to cultivate workers as consumers, providing a foundation for the transformation of the world and its contents into commodities. He analyzes the extent to which the illustrations of Grandville portray this process. As Benjamin writes, "Fashion prescribes the ritual according to which the commodity fetish wishes to be worshipped; Grandville extends fashion's claims both to the objects of everyday use and to the cosmos," disclosing the nature of fashion which, "resides in its conflict with the organic. It couples the living body to the inorganic world. Against the living it asserts the rights of the corpse. Fetishism, which is subject to the sex appeal of the inorganic, is its vital nerve. The cult of commodities places it in its service."

Louis Philippe, or the Interior 
In this section, Benjamin explores the advent of apartments and interior decoration. "For the private person, living space becomes, for the first time, antithetical to the place of work." The apartment "entombs" the traces of its occupant.

Baudelaire, or the Streets of Paris 
Michael Jennings writes that:

Haussmann, or the Barricades 
This section describes the co-evolution of Haussmann's renovation of Paris, and the advent of modern finance capital. Benjamin writes that:

According to Benjamin scholar Michael Jennings, the concept of "phatasmagoria" is pervasive in Benjamin's later writings on Baudelaire. Originally an eighteenth-century illusionistic optical device by which shadows of moving figures were projected onto a way or screen, phantasmagoria, as Benjamin uses the term to evoke the network of commodities when they function within extensive networks, suppressing human rational capacities and appealing instead to the emotions, much as a religious fetish appeals to and organizes a religious belief structure.

See also 
 The Frankfurt School
 Marxist hermeneutics

References 

German literary criticism
Works by Walter Benjamin
Contemporary philosophical literature